Mike Cierpiot (born January 14, 1953) is a Republican member of the Missouri Senate. He represents the 30th District, which encompasses a part of Jackson County.

Personal life
Cierpiot was born January 14, 1953, in Kansas City, Missouri. He was educated at Longview Community College and the University of Missouri–Kansas City. He is married to Connie J. Cierpiot, who also served in the Missouri House of Representatives, and they have two sons and two grandchildren.

In addition to his career as a legislator, Cierpiot was once a network engineer for AT&T.

Cierpiot and his family attend First Church of the Nazarene, in Blue Springs.

Political career
Cierpiot served in the Missouri House of Representatives from 2011 until 2017.  From 2011 to 2013, he represented District 56. From 2013 to 2017, he represented District 30. Before becoming a representative, he was a committee member of the Jackson County Republican Party from 1993 to 2003. Due to Missouri's term limits, Cierpiot term as a state representative ended in 2018.

In November after the 2012 election, Cierpiot was selected by House Republicans as the Assistant Majority Floor Leader. In August 2015, Cierpiot was selected by House Republicans as the Majority Floor Leader.

In November 2017, Cierpiot won a special election to the Missouri Senate 50-42% in District 8.

Electoral history

State Representative

State Senate

Legislative assignments
In addition to his position as Assistant Majority Floor Leader, Mike Cierpiot is an ex officio member of all committees of the House, as well as a member of the following committees:
Elementary And Secondary Education
Leadership For Missouri Issue Development (vice chair)
Utilities (communications, energy, environmental and transportation)
Issue Development Standing Committee On Cowboy Caucus On Agricultural Issues
Missouri Sportsman Issue Development
Joint Committee on Missouri's Promise
Oral Health Issue Development

Political views
Cierpiot describes himself as a conservative, and favors reducing government restrictions on business. He has expressed support for the use of tax incentives in an attempt to attract business to Missouri. He has expressed concern that western cities in Missouri are losing jobs to Kansas.

On September 12, 2012, Cierpiot voted to overturn Governor Jay Nixon's veto of SB749. The bill allowed health insurance providers to refuse to provide coverage for contraception based on moral convictions.

In 2012, Cierpiot endorsed the Missouri Public Prayer Amendment to the state constitution, which was approved by Missouri voters on August 7, 2012.

In 2014, Cierpiot voted in favor of reducing income taxes on individuals in Missouri, and against the use of red light cameras in the state.

Cierpiot has received a 92% rating from the National Rifle Association, an 82% rating from the American Conservative Union, and a 96% rating from the Missouri Chamber of Commerce, one of the highest in the Missouri House of Representatives.

References

External links

Website

1953 births
Living people
Politicians from Kansas City, Missouri
University of Missouri–Kansas City alumni
Republican Party Missouri state senators
Republican Party members of the Missouri House of Representatives
21st-century American politicians